Nelvana Enterprises, Inc. (previously known as Nelvana Limited, sometimes known as Nelvana Animation and simply Nelvana or Nelvana Communications) is a Canadian animation studio and entertainment company owned by Corus Entertainment. Founded in July 1971 by Michael Hirsh, Patrick Loubert and Clive A. Smith, it was named after Nelvana of the Northern Lights, the first Canadian national superhero, who was created by Adrian Dingle. The company's production logo is a polar bear looking at Polaris, the North Star.

The company is based in Toronto, Ontario, and it maintains international offices in France, Ireland and Japan, as well as smaller offices in the top three cities in the U.S. Many of its films, shows and specials are based on licensed properties and literature, but original programming is also part of its roster. Although the company specializes in children's media, Nelvana has also co-produced adult animations like Clone High, John Callahan's Quads, Bob & Margaret, and Committed.

Nelvana International distributes Nickelodeon's Taina, and the first five seasons of The Fairly OddParents. , its library comprised more than 1,650 cumulative half-hours of original programming.

History

1960s

Founders Michael Hirsh and Patrick Loubert first met at York University in 1967, and were also filmmakers, making films with other students. This was Loubert's first experience with filming, as he commented on it:

Since a television and film industry in Canada was scarce at the time, Loubert, Hirsh and their friends Jack Christie and Peter Dewdney from York University, began running a small company named Laff Arts. The studio would be involved in the production of small experimental films during their lifetime.

It was then on a phone call when they would first meet Clive A. Smith. He actually had a history with himself, beginning his career in 1964, being an animator on The Beatles and The Lone Ranger. Smith then moved to Canada to work on short films and commercials.

Smith designed the business card for the company. It showed a suited businessman on the front. When you opened the card, his pants would fall down. At one point, at the end of the company's existence, people from an ad agency told the company that they had to quit using the Laff Arts name because it was too wacky. Hirsh recalled:

By the early 1970s, Laff Arts was no longer being used as a name.

1970s

Nelvana started in 1971 when two graduates of York University, Michael Hirsh and Patrick Loubert, teamed up with a Vitaphone animator-designer Clive A. Smith in Toronto, Ontario. Hirsh and Loubert, who had a passion for underground filmmaking, had founded a small company called Laff Arts in the late 1960s. Smith, whose interest was in rock n' roll music, had previously been among the crew for the Beatles' animated series and their 1968 film, Yellow Submarine. Hirsh has commented on the background of Nelvana's founding:

Soon after they saw a collection of local comic books from the 1940s and acquired the ownership rights. In turn, they made a half-hour television documentary for the CBC focusing on Canadian comics. Their two-year traveling tour of the art from the National Gallery of Canada, "Comic Art Traditions in Canada, 1941–45", gave locals a chance to revisit the country's past heritage in that field. Meanwhile, Hirsh and Loubert collaborated on a related primer from Peter Martin and Associates, The Great Canadian Comic Books. Amid all this success, Hirsh, Loubert and Smith named their new enterprise Nelvana—after a Canadian comic book superheroine from World War II, Nelvana of the Northern Lights, who was one of the characters in the Canadian Whites canon.

A derelict apartment in downtown Toronto served as the company's first building, and a homemade wooden stand mounted over a toilet was among its first camera equipment. "To create zooms," Hirsh recalled of his early experience with this machine, "we would pile up phone books under the art work." During their first year and a half, the trio lived off a superfluous Chargex credit card that Loubert received at university, spending up to C$7,500 on it before they reclaimed double that cost as their first ever transaction. Under those conditions, Nelvana was involved in the production of documentaries and live-action films during the early 1970s. In the area of part-time animation work, they made ten C$1,500 fillers for the CBC.

Among the studio's first productions was a low-budget CBC short subject series, Small Star Cinema, which combined live-action and animation to tell stories of ordinary life from a child's point of view. It was followed by Nelvana's first ever television special Christmas Two Step in 1975, a similarly styled special in which a girl tries to be a lead dancer at a Christmas pageant. When Nelvana was founded in 1971, their original goal was to create live-action productions involving animation in them during their early days.

Nelvana worked on their first television specials: A Cosmic Christmas (1977), The Devil and Daniel Mouse (1978), Romie-0 and Julie-8 (1979), Please Don't Eat the Planet (better known by its subtitle, Intergalactic Thanksgiving) (1979), Easter Fever (1980) and Take Me Up to the Ball Game (1980). During that time, George Lucas, who was impressed with A Cosmic Christmas, commissioned the company to work on a 10-minute sequence for the CBS and CTV TV film, Star Wars Holiday Special in 1978. This short scene, officially entitled "The Faithful Wookiee", would not only feature the original character's voices including Harrison Ford, Mark Hamill, Carrie Fisher, Anthony Daniels and James Earl Jones, but also introduce audiences to the villainous bounty hunter Boba Fett, who would not make his first theatrical appearance until two years later in 1980's The Empire Strikes Back. This first animated appearance created a great buzz around the new character. Nelvana also started to use the polar bear as its mascot.

1980s

At the beginning of the 1980s, Nelvana was offered the chance to work on Heavy Metal, an animated anthology of science fiction stories that studios in Canada and other countries were working on. Nelvana declined this opportunity, instead going on to concentrate on the production of its first feature film, Rock & Rule.

Based heavily on the earlier special The Devil and Daniel Mouse, and originally titled Drats!, the film was produced for five years using all of the studio's resources, totalling $8 million. Upon its release by MGM/UA in 1983, it received little promotion in the U.S. and quickly disappeared at the box office.

The financial demise of Rock & Rule would have ended Nelvana's operations altogether, had the company never saved themselves from debt by working full-time on children's television series. On its agenda at that time were its first three live-action franchises, The Edison Twins, 20 Minute Workout and Mr. Microchip. With DIC Entertainment, Nelvana worked on the first season of Inspector Gadget, and animated the pilot episode of The Get Along Gang.

Early in the decade, the company worked on four television specials based on American Greetings properties. They were The Magic of Herself the Elf, based on Mattel's toy line; Strawberry Shortcake: Housewarming Surprise; Strawberry Shortcake and the Baby Without a Name; and Strawberry Shortcake Meets the Berrykins, the last three of which featured the eponymous doll. There were two shows from Nelvana based on the AmToy properties, Madballs and My Pet Monster.

Despite the successes of their earlier works, perhaps its greatest success at the time came in the form of the Care Bears, thanks to its acquisition of the character rights from American Greetings, the franchise owners. In early 1985, the first film based on the toy line turned the company's assets around, grossing US$23 million in the U.S., and another $1.5 million in its native Canada. Its tremendous success gave way to two more feature films, A New Generation and Adventure in Wonderland, as well as a television series.

In the area of science fiction, Nelvana produced Droids and Ewoks, two Saturday-morning series based on Star Wars. At one point, there was talk of an animated CBS show from the studio, based on BBC's Doctor Who; the plan never came to fruition, but concept art was created by Ted Bastien.

For Orion Pictures' 1986 live-action western comedy, Three Amigos, the company made use of lip-sync animation for a musical sequence in which the main characters sing a song at a campfire, with their horses singing along. In 1987, Michael Hirsh produced Nelvana's first self-made film of this calibre, the comedy feature Burglar, which was the first live-action feature film the company had ever produced.

Also in 1987, the company, along with independent filmmaker Pierre David, film, video, and television production company Malofilm Group, and home video distributor New Star Entertainment, formed Image Organization, an independent production company that mainly specialized in the thriller genre and tied itself to over 100 films in the international market by 1996. Nelvana and New Star would sell their shares in the company to David and Malofilm in 1989.

In 1988, Nelvana and Scholastic Corporation produced a video series of The Video Adventures of Clifford the Big Red Dog based on the 1962 book. It was also distributed by Family Home Entertainment on the video releases.

The company's fourth live-action series, T. and T., premiered in 1988 on Canada's Global network. The show's titular duo was Mr. T of A-Team fame, playing a former boxer named T.S. Turner, and Canadian actress Kristina Nicoll as an East Coast lawyer by the name of Terri Taler. Nelvana faced bankruptcy for the second time when the show's original U.S. distributor was going out of business; in six weeks, they were saved when they found a replacement. Also that year, Nelvana established BearSpots, a facility for producing television commercials that lasted until 1993.

As the decade came to a close, the revived Nelvana had its next big success with a film and an HBO television show based on Jean de Brunhoff's Babar book series. This franchise, its first international co-production, won many ACE Awards in the U.S. and Geminis in Canada. In September 1989, ABC began to air one of the company's products: an animated series based on Tim Burton's Beetlejuice.

1990s

Following Babar's success, the studio acquired the rights to animated series based on Hergé's The Adventures of Tintin, Maurice Sendak's Little Bear, Joanna Cole's The Magic School Bus and the British comic strip Rupert Bear. Nelvana had self-made successes of its own during the 1990s, such as Eek! The Cat, Dog City (with Jim Henson Productions) and Ned's Newt (with TMO Film GmbH). Less successful was its animated series for children, Roseanne Barr's Little Rosey  for the American Broadcasting Company, which was cancelled in 1991, after its first season.

In Autumn 1993, Nelvana signed a multi-year project to produce five feature films for Paramount Pictures, with Kathleen Kennedy and Frank Marshall producing; the first two began production the following summer, at a cost of over US$20 million each. Three of the projects were based on books by E. B. White (The Trumpet of the Swan), Clive Barker (The Thief of Always) and Graeme Base (The Sign of the Seahorse); an original production called Mask Vision was also in the works.

However, none of those films ever made it past the finishing stage. During the 1990s, another set of features from Nelvana was distributed by various companies. A 1993 live-action psychological thriller called Malice came out under the Columbia Pictures banner; 1997 saw the studio's retelling of Pippi Longstocking from Warner Bros.; and Babar: King of the Elephants was released in Canada by Alliance Atlantis in 1999. Among them, only Malice would go on to achieve box-office success in North America. Its US$46 million gross was the highest ever attained by a Nelvana production, doubling what the first Care Bears Movie received during its original release.

In 1993, Nelvana along with Galaxy Films and De Souza Productions produced Cadillacs and Dinosaurs for the CBS network, based on the comic book of the same name (formally known as Xenozoic Tales) by Mark Schultz. It only lasted one season.

In September 1995, Nelvana produced Nancy Drew and The Hardy Boys based on the popular well-known book series. Tracy Ryan portrayed Nancy Drew while Colin Gray and Paul Popowich portrayed Frank and Joe Hardy, respectively. In addition, Jehene Erwin and Joy Tanner portrayed Bess Marvin and George Fayne, respectively, on Nancy Drew, while Fiona Highet played new character Kate Craigen. The series were based on The Nancy Drew Files and The Hardy Boys Casefiles. However, the series was not distributed well, mostly due to it being in first-run syndication, and both series were cancelled in December.

In September 1996, Golden Books Family Entertainment was in talks to acquire the company for US$102 million, just after having purchased the family video library of Broadway Video Entertainment, a subsidiary of Broadway Video. Many of the company's staff members, including Smith and Loubert, expressed interest in the proposition. But Hirsh went up against it, arguing with then COO Eleanor Olmsted about its possible effects on his institution. Two months later Golden Books withdrew from the deal stating that they would concentrate more on children's entertainment.

In November 1996, Virgin Interactive released Toonstruck, a PC-based adventure game featuring animation and artwork produced by Nelvana and Rainbow Animation. The game was set in an animated world using traditional 2D animation, but also featured the digitized likeness of actor Christopher Lloyd as a live-action character trapped in the animated world interacting with the cartoon characters around him. A sequel to the game was planned, but was cancelled due to poor sales.

In 1997, a small computer animation company called Windlight Studios was absorbed into Nelvana's assets. Its co-founder, Scott Dyer, became Nelvana's senior vice-president in charge of production in late 2001.

In late 1997, Nelvana and UK's Channel 4 began work on Bob and Margaret, the company's first animated franchise for adults since Rock & Rule. It was based on the National Film Board of Canada's Bob's Birthday, an Academy Award winner for Best Short, which Channel 4 also produced.

In December 1997, Nelvana began distributing a syndicated programming block, the Nelvana Kidz Klub, through MediaVentures International, a Chicago-based distributor. The block was offered internationally on a barter program distribution model with 1–2 hours of daily sections or 3–4 hours of the weekend block.

In 1998, Nelvana entered into an agreement with U.S. network CBS to program a new Saturday morning animation block for the 1998-99 television season, which would be branded as CBS Kidshow. The block would feature six new series based on children's book properties, and all were to comply with the U.S. government's educational programming guidelines. In April 1998, Nelvana entered into an agreement with ITV franchise Scottish Television to co-produce these new series, and hold distribution rights to them in the United Kingdom. In August 1998, Nelvana acquired Kids Can Press, publishers of the Franklin and Elliot Moose children's books upon which the Franklin and Elliot Moose were based. This turned them into an "integrated company" in which Kids Can's subsequent publications would begin with Nelvana's franchising of those works.

The company's first two computer-animated shows, Donkey Kong Country and Rolie Polie Olie (with Paris-based Sparx* and distributed by Disney Channel) premiered on U.S. television in 1998.

In March 1999, Nelvana reported a 75% increase in earnings in 1998, credited to increased original production and sales of its library programming, the deal with CBS, and the addition of a publishing business with the acquisition of Kids Can Press. In August 1999, Nelvana announced a US$40 million deal to produce six new series based on popular children's books for a planned PBS Kids block. The six series—Timothy Goes to School, Seven Little Monsters, Corduroy, Marvin the Tap-Dancing Horse, George Shrinks and Elliot Moose—were launched the following September as part of the Bookworm Bunch line-up. That same month, it acquired the North American rights to its first anime property, Clamp's Cardcaptor Sakura (which was renamed Cardcaptors for its English dub).

2000s

In April 2000, Nelvana announced that it had filed for two category 2 television licenses from the Canadian Radio-television and Telecommunications Commission to launch digital cable channels. The first, titled "The Nelvana Channel," would've presented the company's library of material alongside related information in a picture-in-picture format. The second, "Booknet," was to be focused on adaptations of adult and children's literature, and would have been a 60/40 joint venture between Corus Entertainment and Nelvana. The channels were approved that following November. Both licenses expired as neither launched by the required date of November 24, 2004.

On April 14, 2000, Nelvana announced its purchase of the Palo Alto-based children's book publisher Klutz in a US$74 million deal—at that time, its largest buyout ever— and integrated it into its Branded Consumer Products division. The company, founded in 1977, was best known for its children's series, Books Plus. Nelvana's separate subsidiary, Kids Can, began taking advantage of the acquisition by making its output available through Klutz merchandise.

In September 2000, Corus announced that it would acquire Nelvana for $540 million. The company saw the purchase as being a complement to its children's television networks, including YTV and Treehouse.

A year after Corus' purchase, co-founders and co-CEOs Loubert and Smith left the studio. Loubert voluntarily left in November after Corus eliminated 50 positions from the staff, saying "The time has come that Corus will stop acquiring for a while and start operating. John Cassaday has made that clear, but this makes my job less rather than more".

In 2001, Nelvana acquired the rights to the English-language version of yet another anime series, Medabots. The following January, Beyblade (in association with Hasbro and Mitsubishi) became its third such property.

In October 2002, Corus announced Hirsh's resignation; the following month, Paul Robertson, former president of Corus Television and head of YTV, became leader of the studio's senior management. With Hirsh's departure, Corus announced a C$200 million writedown for the company; by next August, it planned to reduce the staff down to 200. Hirsh has also taken an advisory role in the studio.

The following September, Corus launched their home entertainment division. Texas-based FUNimation, along with British company Maverick, has distributed titles from the studio with this label, including Redwall, Pecola, Tales from the Cryptkeeper, Timothy Goes to School and the holiday special The Santa Claus Brothers. Nelvana's newer titles have been distributed by MGM, Lionsgate and ADV Films, which have no involvement with the label. In 2007, home video distribution rights for the company's catalog were transferred to Shout! Factory.

In 2004, the studio produced an animation anthology, which included 10 recurring shorts. Titled Funpak, it aired on YTV for 13 weeks starting in February 2005, with the winning short announced to be greenlit in May of that year. One of the shorts, Sidekick, was the one adapted into a successful cartoon series from 2010 to 2013.

In May 2006, NBC Universal announced a joint venture with Nelvana, Ion Media Networks, Scholastic, and Classic Media, known as Qubo, which aimed to operate a multi-platform children's educational television brand in the U.S. featuring programming from its partners.

In September 2006, Nelvana was integrated into Corus' children's television division. A spin-off unit, Nelvana Enterprises, was created in the process, to focus on international distribution of the company's shows. Scott Dyer, the studio's executive vice-president of production and development, became the overseer of the division, which includes Treehouse TV, Discovery Kids Canada, and YTV. Doug Murphy, another former EVP at Nelvana, became president of the new distribution unit.

In October 2006, Nelvana announced a co-production agreement with Canadian toy maker Spin Master and Japanese partners TMS Entertainment, Sega Toys and Japan Vistec to create the new anime property Bakugan Battle Brawlers. The series debuted in Canada on Teletoon the following summer and became a quick success. In 2008, merchandising rights were sold by Nelvana to Cartoon Network in the U.S., and the series began airing on the channel in February 2008. The initial incarnation of the franchise ran for four seasons, spanning 189 episodes and stimulated billions in merchandise sales.

2010s

Following Bakugan, Nelvana entered into another anime co-production, this time reviving the Beyblade property with d-rights, Takara Tomy, Hasbro, Tatsunoko Pro and SynergySP. Beyblade: Metal Fusion debuted globally in 2010, running for 141 episodes before inspiring a direct spin-off, as well as a sub-franchise consisting of BeyWheelz, BeyWarriors: BeyRaiderz and BeyWarriors: Cyborg.

Detentionaire was produced between 2011 and 2015. Created for Teletoon, the show has also been aired internationally, including on ABC3, and has been released on a digital platform provided by Cartoon Network.

In 2012, Corus Entertainment acquired Canadian animation software developer Toon Boom. Nelvana had already used the company's software on projects like 6teen, Ruby Gloom as well as the aforementioned Detentionaire. Going forward, all of the studio's internally animated 2D productions would utilize their sister company's suite of products.

After Murphy had been appointed as CEO of Corus Entertainment, Scott Dyer was named president of Nelvana in 2015. The next year, Pam Westman became head of Nelvana Enterprises.

On October 19, 2016, Nelvana redesigned their logo to mark the studio's 45th anniversary, as well as take part in Corus' brand refresh following latter's acquisition of Shaw Media. According to Dyer, this also symbolized a strategic shift from merchandise-based properties to more creator-driven projects, as well as a return to international co-productions. At that year's MIPCOM, the studio showcased new shows Esme & Roy (with Sesame Workshop), Hotel Transylvania: The Series and Mysticons. Nelvana also presented Bravest Warriors, a pre-existing series from Frederator Studios that they were now producing and Corn & Peg, a co-production with the US Nickelodeon.

The following October, Nelvana announced the launch of a new joint venture with Discovery Communications (WBD) to create children's content for Canada, Latin America and the rest of the world. Later named "redknot", the division's first two projects include The Dog & Pony Show and Agent Binky: Pets of the Universe.

In 2018, Nelvana appointed Cinedigm as the company's new U.S. home video partner. In late 2018, the company relaunched Bakugan with Bakugan: Battle Planet, a co-production between Nelvana, Spin Master Entertainment, TMS Entertainment and Man of Action Studios.

The studio launched its first short film, The Most Magnificent Thing, in 2019 to showcase its technical abilities. Later that year, Dyer announced his retirement, with Westman named as his replacement.

2020s
In October 2020, Nelvana agreed to co-produce Thomas & Friends: All Engines Go (with Mattel Television), a re-imagined revival of the original Thomas & Friends series, marking the franchise's first 2D-animated television series. That same month, the company entered an agreement with Duncan Studio to produce animated feature films.

Franchises

Many of Nelvana's TV shows are based on properties from other companies, most of which started in other forms of media (excluding its namesake superhero, which never received an adaptation of any kind). A great deal of them are based on children's literature and comic books; examples include Blazing Dragons, Stickin' Around, Wayside, Cadillacs and Dinosaurs, The Adventures of Tintin, Anatole, Babar, The Berenstain Bears (2003 series), Franklin the Turtle, Jane and the Dragon, Little Bear, The Magic School Bus, Pippi Longstocking, Redwall, Rupert, My Dad the Rock Star, and the shows of the PBS Kids Bookworm Bunch block, as well as Tales From the Cryptkeeper, Beetlejuice, Jacob Two-Two, Sidekick and Teletoon/Nick Jr.'s Miss Spider's Sunny Patch Friends.

Nelvana has also had considerable success with animated fare based on toys; American Greetings' Care Bears has been the most familiar example of this. Also, there have been series and specials based on Strawberry Shortcake (also from American Greetings), Madballs and My Pet Monster (from AmToy) and Rescue Heroes (from Fisher-Price). Nelvana also produced Fresh Beat Band of Spies, an animated revival of The Fresh Beat Band that is produced by 6 Point Harness for Nickelodeon.

It has also translated big-screen franchises to televised properties, such as Star Wars (Droids and Ewoks), Beetlejuice, An American Tail (Fievel's American Tails), Free Willy and The Neverending Story. It has even ventured into the video game world with a show based on Nintendo's Donkey Kong: Donkey Kong Country.

In the field of anime, the company holds the North American rights to Clamp/Kodansha's Cardcaptor Sakura series. Also, it holds international licensing rights to Beyblade and Medabots and the Bakugan franchise.

As with many other animation studios, Nelvana has a wide range of established original series and characters within its roster. 6teen, Clone High, Birdz, Corn & Peg and Eek! The Cat among others, are some of Nelvana's more notable animated series that were not based on any other source material.

, the studio has made close to 25 feature films for theatrical, home entertainment, and television distribution. Well-known releases include Rock & Rule, the first five Care Bears movies, two Babar films and 1997's Pippi Longstocking.

Live-action has been a part of its mainstay from its early years. The company has had Burglar and Malice as its own feature projects in that area, and has contributed as such to Star Wars Holiday Special and Three Amigos. On television, Nelvana has made live-action shows such as The Edison Twins, Nancy Drew, The Hardy Boys, and Life with Boys.

On February 5, 2013, Nelvana launched the Treehouse Direct channel on YouTube. On March 2, 2015, Treehouse TV would launch its own YouTube channel.

On April 29, 2015 they launched a YouTube channel promoted by YTV as Nelvana Retro, which was renamed "YTV Direct" in 2016 after also deciding to incorporate non-Nelvana content such as Nickelodeon shows. It was later renamed Keep it Weird to incorporate more content from the company.

Around the world
The Fairly OddParents, created by animator Butch Hartman, was distributed by Nelvana outside the U.S. from 2001 to 2004. This show has been in the top of the ratings for Nickelodeon, YTV and the BBC, and has also been successful among viewers in several European markets, Latin America, Australia, and Canada.

In the United States, Nelvana's series have been broadcast on terrestrial and cable networks, and internationally on over 360 television stations in more 180 countries, in approximately 50 languages.

Notable personnel

Apart from its three founders, there have been several key personnel from Nelvana's past and present, a great deal of whom have left the company. Among the better-known people to work in the studio are Wayne Gilbert, Peter Hudecki, Vincenzo Natali, Arna Selznick Natalie Turner and John van Bruggen.

Former Nelvana employees, Roger Allers, Charles Bonifacio, Tom Sito, Ralph Palmer, Kori Rae, ,Joe Ranft, David Soren and Ralph Zondag went on to become staff members at Walt Disney Feature Animation and DreamWorks Animation in the 1980s, 1990s and 2000s. Allers went on to work on Aladdin, The Incredibles, The Lion King, and Hercules. Lenora Hume, from the company's early years, is the senior vice-president of DisneyToon Studios, Pixar.

Influence in popular culture
Star Trek: The Next Generation season 3 episode "The Defector" featured the planet Nelvana III named in honor of the animation studio.

Nelvana also had a planet named after it in the Star Wars series, on Cartoon Network's expanded universe series Clone Wars. During Chapters 23 to 25, Anakin Skywalker travels to a planet called Nelvaan. Clone Wars also pays homage to the franchise's animation predecessors in the form of the planet's dog-like inhabitants, who resemble characters from Rock & Rule, the studio's first film.

The "Nelvana Independent Short Film Grand Prize", given out at the Ottawa International Animation Festival since 2004, is sponsored by the company. So far, the recipients of this prize have been 2004's Ryan, the Chris Landreth biography about Canadian animator Ryan Larkin; 2005's Milch, from director Igor Kovalyov; and, in 2006, Joanna Quinn's Dreams and Desires: Family Ties.

See also

Cinema of Canada
History of Canadian film
History of Canadian animation
List of Nelvana programs

Related Canadian companies
National Film Board of Canada
Cookie Jar Group (formerly Cinar, bought and folded into DHX Media in 2012)
CinéGroupe
Atkinson Film-Arts (defunct since 1989)
WildBrain
C.O.R.E. (defunct since 2010)

Notes

References

Bibliography

Stoffman, Daniel (2001). The Nelvana Story: Thirty Animated Years. Toronto, Ontario: Nelvana Publishing Company.

External links
 
 
 
 Stamp of the superheroine after whom the company was named
 "Three Men and a bear: Nelvana at 25" by Ellen Besen and Marc Glassman, Take One (Autumn 1996) at LookSmart's Find Articles
 Canadian Jewish News: "Nelvana has found the formula for success" by Sheldon Kirshner

Nelvana
1971 establishments in Ontario
Canadian companies established in 1971
2000 mergers and acquisitions
American animation studios
Canadian animation studios
Companies based in Toronto
Mass media companies established in 1971
Topcraft
Dubbing (filmmaking)
Television production companies of Canada
Lucasfilm
Corus Entertainment subsidiaries